Hans-Günther von Rost (15 November 1894 – 23 March 1945) was a German general in the Wehrmacht of Nazi Germany during World War II. He was a recipient of the Knight's Cross of the Iron Cross. Rost was killed on 23 March 1945 near Székesfehérvár, Hungary.

Awards and decorations 

 Knight's Cross of the Iron Cross on 21 March 1945 as Generalleutnant and commander of 44. Reichsgrenadier-Division "Hoch- und Deutschmeister"

References

Citations

Bibliography

1894 births
1945 deaths
German Army personnel killed in World War II
German Army personnel of World War I
Lieutenant generals of the German Army (Wehrmacht)
Military personnel from Hanover
People from the Province of Hanover
Recipients of the clasp to the Iron Cross, 1st class
Recipients of the Gold German Cross
Recipients of the Knight's Cross of the Iron Cross
Reichswehr personnel
German Army generals of World War II